The Standard Ice Company Building is a historic commercial building at 517 South Main Street in downtown Stuttgart, Arkansas.  Constructed in 1926, the building is in the Spanish Revival style, with a tile roof and glazed brick façade.  The company manufactured blocks of ice for commercial and residential use, and remained in business until 1978.  As household refrigerators became widespread, the facility was used to freeze and pack strawberries, as well as process and freeze ducks killed by local hunters.

The building was listed on the National Register of Historic Places in 1979.

See also
 List of ice companies
 National Register of Historic Places listings in Arkansas County, Arkansas

References

Commercial buildings completed in 1926
Industrial buildings and structures on the National Register of Historic Places in Arkansas
Mission Revival architecture in Arkansas
Ice companies
National Register of Historic Places in Arkansas County, Arkansas
Historic district contributing properties in Arkansas
Stuttgart, Arkansas